Guilty Without Guilt, (Bez viny vinovatye) is a 1945 Soviet drama film directed by Vladimir Petrov.

Plot 
The film tells about the famous actress Kruchinina, who goes on tour to a city about which she has bad memories, and meets her angry alcoholic son, who plays in the local theater.

Starring 
 Alla Tarasova as Elena Ivanovna Kruchinina (as A. K. Tarasova)
 Viktor Stanitsyn as Nil Stratonych Dudukin (as V. Ya. Stanitsin)
 Boris Livanov as Grigoriy Lvovich Murov (as B. N. Livanov)
 Olga Vikland as Nina Pavlovna Korinkina (as O. A. Vikland)
 Vladimir Druzhnikov as Grigoriy Neznamov (as V. V. Druzhnikov)
 Aleksey Gribov as Shmaga (as A. N. Gribov)
 Pavel Massalsky as Petya Milovzorov (as P. V. Massalskiy)
 Sofya Khalyutina as Arina Galchikha (as S. V. Khalyutina)
 Nikolai Konovalov as Theatre impresario (as N. L. Konovalov)
 Boris Shukhmin as Assistant director (as B. N. Shukhmin)
 Sofya Garrel as Shelavina (uncredited)

References

External links 
 

1945 films
1940s Russian-language films
Soviet drama films
1945 drama films
Soviet black-and-white films